The 1981 Uber Cup was the tenth edition of the Uber Cup, the women's badminton team competition. The tournament took place in the 1980-81 badminton season. Japan won its fifth title after beating Indonesia in the Final Round in Tokyo.

Qualifying

Australian Zone

First qualifying round

Final qualifying round

European Zone

First qualifying round

Second qualifying round

Final Qualification Round

Pan American Zone

First qualifying round

Final Qualification Round

Final Tournament

First round

Second round

Grand Final

References

Uber Cup
Uber Cup
Thomas & Uber Cup
1981 in Japanese sport
Badminton tournaments in Japan